A disciple is a follower and student of a mentor, teacher, or other figure.  It can refer to:

Religion
 Disciple (Christianity), a student of Jesus Christ
 Twelve Apostles of Jesus, sometimes called the Twelve Disciples
 Seventy disciples in the Gospel of Luke
 Christian Church (Disciples of Christ), a Protestant denomination in North America descended from the Campbell movement
 Disciples of Christ (Campbell Movement), a Christian group that arose during the Second Great Awakening
 Disciples of `Abdu'l-Bahá, 19 Western Bahá'ís
 The ten principal disciples of Buddha
 Disciples of Confucius
 Disciples of Jesus in Islam
 Student of Kriya Yoga, of direct lineage to Mahavatar Babaji
 Sahabah, the disciples of Muhammad
 Follower of Paramahansa Yogananda
 Śishya, the disciple in the Guru–shishya tradition of Hinduism
 Śrāvaka (Sanskrit) or savaka (Pali), disciples in Buddhism and Jainism
 Tarmida ('disciple'), a junior priest in Mandaeism

Books, games, and films
 Disciple (film), a 2013 Finnish film
 Disciples (film), a 2014 American horror film
 Disciple (Image Comics), a Spawn character
 The Disciples (Demonata), demon hunters in the Demonata novels by Darren Shan
 The Disciples (novel) (1993), a spy novel by Joe Andrew
 Disciples: Sacred Lands, a computer game published by Strategy First in 1999
 Disciples II: Dark Prophecy, a computer game released in 2002
 Disciples III: Renaissance,  a computer game released in 2010
 The Disciple (2020 film), a 2020 Indian film

Music
 Disciple (band), Christian metal band
Disciple (album), 2005 studio album by the band
 The Disciples (band), a London reggae band
 Disciples (production team), British production trio
 xDISCIPLEx A.D., a Christian hardcore punk band
 "Disciple", a song by Nas on the album Street's Disciple
 "Disciple", a song by Raven on the album Architect of Fear
 "Disciple", a song by Slayer on the album God Hates Us All
 "Disciples", a song by Tame Impala on the album Currents

Other
 The Disciple, a ring name of professional wrestler Brutus Beefcake
 Black Disciples, a street gang based in Chicago, Illinois
 Gangster Disciples, a street gang based in Chicago, Illinois

See also
Apostle (disambiguation)
 Disciples of Christ (disambiguation)